Hajjiabad Beshaq (also Romanized as Ḩājjīābād Besḩāq; also known as Ḩājjīābād and Ḩājīābād) is a village in Borborud-e Gharbi Rural District, in the Central District of Aligudarz County, Lorestan Province, Iran. At the 2006 census, its population was 60, in 13 families.

References 

Towns and villages in Aligudarz County